Titus de Bobula (1878–1961) was a Hungarian-American architect.

He was born in Hungary to János Bobula, Sr. (1844–1903), a Budapest architect and politician, and he studied at Budapest University of Technology and Economics, along with his brother, János Jr. (1871–1922), who also became an architect.

Titus de Bobula emigrated to the United States around 1897, living and working at times in New York City and Marietta, Ohio. In 1903, he arrived in Pittsburgh, Pennsylvania, where he designed buildings for the next eight years. One of his major commissions was St. John the Baptist Greek Catholic Church in Munhall, Pennsylvania, patterned after the Rusyn Greek Catholic Cathedral of the Exaltation of the Holy Cross in Uzhhorod, Austria-Hungary. The church's twin towers, which rise 125 feet, are composed of white brick in a Greek cruciform pattern set into sandstone. His last building in Greater Pittsburgh was St. Peter and St. Paul Russian Greek-Catholic (now Ukrainian Orthodox) Church in Carnegie, Pennsylvania.

In 1910, he married Eurania Dinkey Mock of Bethlehem, Pennsylvania (a niece of the wife of Charles M. Schwab, president at times of the Carnegie Steel Company, U.S. Steel, and Bethlehem Steel), and the couple moved to New York City. He returned to Hungary in the early 1920s and turned to political activism. On Nov. 10, 1923, the front page of the New York Times read: "Titus De Bobula Jailed in Budapest: Husband of Mrs. C. M. Schwab's Niece Arrested for Plot to Overthrow (Hungarian) Government."

He was back in the U.S. by the 1930s, and in the words of Nikola Tesla biographer Marc Seifer, he "was hired to design the tower, power plant, and housing for the inventor's 'impenetrable shield between nations'" – a futuristic electronic weapons system.

De Bobula moved to Washington, D.C., in the 1930s. A Washington Post obituary from 1961 described him as a retired consulting architect best known for designing churches in Ohio and Pennsylvania.

He and his wife are buried in Bethlehem, Pennsylvania.

References

1878 births
1961 deaths
De Bobula, Titus
De Bobula, Titus
19th-century Hungarian architects
Austro-Hungarian emigrants to the United States
Architects from Budapest
19th-century American architects